Lenka Bartáková (born 17 May 1991) is a Czech professional basketball player. She plays for Czech Republic women's national basketball team. She competed in the 2012 Summer Olympics.

References

1991 births
Living people
Czech women's basketball players
Olympic basketball players of the Czech Republic
Basketball players at the 2012 Summer Olympics
People from Sokolov
Point guards
Sportspeople from the Karlovy Vary Region